Oscar Fisher (February 6, 1812 – May 7, 1882) was an American politician.

Fisher, son of Olcott and Eunice (Royce) Fisher, was born in West Woodstock, Conn., February 6, 1812.  He graduated from Yale College in 1836. After graduation, he took charge, for a few years, of Nichols Academy, in Dudley, Mass, where he had mainly fitted for college.  While there he mained Jane Fay Bemis, niece and adopted daughter of Phineas Bemis, Esq, of Dudley, who died in Newark, N.J., March 31, 1849, while her husband was engaged in teaching there. Some time after this affliction, his health having become impaired by long confinement in school, he retired from this occupation. He had in the meantime read law, and had been admitted to the bar of Windham County, Conn., but did not at any time engage in practice. In 1862 he settled permanently in his native town, and the next year represented Woodstock in the Connecticut State Legislature. For fourteen years from 1867 he was Judge of Probate for the district of Woodstock. He died in West Woodstock, May 7, 1882, aged 70 years. He was married, May 29, 1866, to Melissa Haskell, who survived him with two daughters. An only son by his first wife died at the age of twenty, when about entering college.

External links

1812 births
1882 deaths
Yale College alumni
Connecticut local politicians
Members of the Connecticut General Assembly
Connecticut state court judges
American lawyers admitted to the practice of law by reading law
People from Woodstock, Connecticut
19th-century American politicians
19th-century American judges